The 12295 / 12296 Sanghamitra Superfast Express is a Superfast Express train that runs daily between the Sir M. Visvesvaraya Terminal in Bengaluru, Karnataka and Danapur railway station in Patna, Bihar. This is the one and only daily train from Patna which connects Patna with Chennai and Bengaluru. It marks as the longest-running daily train of the South Western Railway Division. This train takes a total of 43 hours and 45 minutes to cover the 2681 km distance. Trains numbered 12295UP and 12296DN belong to the Superfast category of Indian Railways.

Relevance

This train was named in honour of Sanghamitra, the daughter of Emperor Ashoka, ruler of Patliputra, the present city of Patna, and the Mauryan Empire. This train is the longest daily superfast train of South Western Railway zone.

History

This train used to run from  every Tuesday and Thursday at 13:30. Then, in early 2001, the train's route was extended to the  departing at 7:00 on Tuesdays and Thursdays and running under the codes 6595/6596.

By 2013, the Patliputra–Yesvantpur Superfast Express route was created and ran on Fridays. It departed from Pataliputra and went to Yeswanthpur. This train, however, ran daily between the Krantivira Sangolli Rayanna Bengaluru City and Patna.

Traction

The route is fully electrified, it is hauled by a WAP-7 (HOG)-equipped locomotive of Royapuram / Krishnarajapuram / Gomoh locomotive shed from Bangalore City to Danapur.

Timings
This train leaves SMVT Bengaluru daily at 9:20 AM, reaching Danapur at 7:40 AM on the third day.
The train leaves Danapur daily at 20:15 to reach SMVT Bengaluru at 16:00 on the third day.

Route and stations
 
 
 
 Kuppam

Coach composition
The train has 1 AC First Cum AC Two Tier, 2 AC 2-Tier, 6 AC 3-Tier, 7 Sleeper class, 3 Second class, 2 Head-on Generator cars, 1 Pantry car and a HCP (High Capacity Parcel Van) (total of 23 LHB coach).

See also

Ganga Kaveri Express
Secunderabad–Danapur Express
Udhna–Danapur Express
Akal Takth Express

External links
 https://web.archive.org/web/20140601030217/http://www.indianrail.gov.in/
 India Rail Info

Transport in Bangalore
Transport in Patna
Express trains in India
Rail transport in Karnataka
Rail transport in Andhra Pradesh
Rail transport in Tamil Nadu
Rail transport in Telangana
Rail transport in Maharashtra
Rail transport in Madhya Pradesh
Rail transport in Uttar Pradesh
Rail transport in Bihar
Railway services introduced in 1988
Named passenger trains of India